Carys Phillips (born 12 November 1992) is a Welsh rugby union player. She plays as a Hooker for the Worcester Warriors in the Premier 15s and for Wales women's national rugby union team.

Personal life 
The daughter of back row forward Rowland Phillips, she studied at Llandovery College and took a course in Sports Coaching and Development at Cardiff Metropolitan University. She is an ambassador for the Red Kites Girls’ Rugby Cluster Centre, an organisation which lends its support to all-girls rugby.

Rugby career 
Phillips has played for Skewen RFC and also for Bristol Ladies, and Ospreys.

Phillips won her first international cap against Ireland in the first round of the 2013 Six Nations Championship. In 2016, She captained Wales in the second round of the Six Nations Championship.

Phillips was selected in Wales squad for the 2021 Rugby World Cup in New Zealand.

References

1992 births
Living people
Alumni of Cardiff Metropolitan University
Ospreys (rugby union) players
Rugby union players from Warrington
Skewen RFC players
Wales international rugby union players
Welsh female rugby union players